Med dvema stoloma  (between two chairs) is a novel by Slovenian author Josip Jurčič. It was first published in 1876.

See also
List of Slovenian novels

Slovenian novels
1876 novels